Ancylobacter defluvii is a bacterium from the family of Xanthobacteraceae.

References

External links
Type strain of Ancylobacter defluvii at BacDive -  the Bacterial Diversity Metadatabase

Hyphomicrobiales
Bacteria described in 2014